Margit Kalocsai (27 December 1909 – 23 November 1993) was a Hungarian gymnast who competed in the 1936 Summer Olympics.  Additionally, at the first-ever World Championships for women, she was the 2nd-place finisher, which stands in extreme contrast to her 41st-place individual result at the 1936 Berlin Summer Olympics where her marks in both the compulsory and voluntary segments on 2 of the 3 events contested were extremely low, considering her performance at the preceding World Championships.

Kalocsai's extreme misfortune at the 1936 Berlin Summer Olympics parallels, with immediately adjacent juxtapositioning, the misfortune of Poland's Janina Skirlińska, who finished just below Kalocsai, in 3rd place, in the individual standings at the 1934 Worlds, (and again in 4th place at the 1938 Worlds which Kalocsai and her Hungarian teammates did not attend), yet just above her at the 1936 Berlin Olympics in 40th place.

References

1909 births
1993 deaths
Hungarian female artistic gymnasts
Olympic gymnasts of Hungary
Gymnasts at the 1936 Summer Olympics
Olympic bronze medalists for Hungary
Olympic medalists in gymnastics
Medalists at the 1936 Summer Olympics
20th-century Hungarian women